It Ain't Over... is an album by British pop rock band The Outfield, released in 1998.  As the follow-up to their 1992 effort 
Rockeye (their last on a major label; in this case, MCA) this stood in sharp contrast, being their debut for an independent label, 'Warning Tracks'.

Track listing 
All tracks by John Spinks except where noted.
"Kiss the Rain"
"Girl of Mine" (Spinks, Lewis)
"It Ain't Over"
"Midnight Moves"
"Dance (The Night Away)"
"Lay Down"
"Slow Motion"
"My Girlfriend's Girlfriend"
"Talking 'Bout Us"
"It's a Crime"
"Chic Lorraine"
"Out to Lunch"

Personnel 
Tony Lewis – vocals, bass
John Spinks – guitar, backing vocals, keyboards, executive producer
Simon Dawson – drums

References

External links 
 

The Outfield albums
1998 albums